Sakshi Ranga Rao (born Rangavajhula Ranga Rao; 15 September 1942 – 27 June 2005) was an Indian character actor who worked in Telugu cinema and Telugu theatre. He appeared in about 450 films over a career spanning four decades, majority of which were comedies. Rao made his film debut in 1967 with Sakshi from which he derived his stage name. He then went onto to appear in successful films like Sirivennela, Swarna Kamalam, April 1st Vidudhala, Joker and Swarabhishekam.

Life and career

Rangavajhula Ranga Rao in Kalavakuru village in Prakasham district, was born to Lakshmi Narayana and Ranganayakamma. As his father died when he was young, he was raised by Buchchi Ravamma, his mother's sister in Machilipatnam. He began his career as a stenographer in Andhra University, Visakhapatnam.

As Rao was interested in film and theatre, he worked as an assistant to the stage artist Kuppili Venkateshwara Rao. He was encouraged by some his friends at Andhra Vishwa Vidyalaya to pursue a full-time career in films. They gathered him some money and sent Rao to Madras.

Director Bapu gave break to Rao with the film Sakshi in 1967. Then onwards, he became known as Sakshi Ranga Rao, also to differentiate himself from S. V. Ranga Rao.  He had the distinction of acting in most of the Telugu films directed by K. Vishwanath, Bapu and Vamsi.

Rao married Bala Tripurasundari. They had three children–one daughter and three sons. His youngest son, actor Saakshi Siva works in Telugu films and television.

Rao died after a prolonged illness on 27 June 2005 in Chennai at the age of 63 years. Incidentally, it was on stage that Rao collapsed on 5 May 2005 during a rehearsal for the Gurazada play, 'Kanyasulkam'. The apparent cause of his death was diabetes and associated kidney failure.

Filmography

 Saakshi (1967) (debut film)
 Sudigundaalu (1967) as Gumasta
 Bhale Rangadu (1969)
 Buddhimanthudu (1969)
 Balaraju Katha (1970)
 Dharma Daata (1970)
 Thaali Bottu (1970) as Rangaiah
 Attalu Kodallu (1971) as brother of Suryakantam
 Adrusta Jathakudu (1971)
 Mattilo Manikyam (1971)
 Vinta Samsaram (1971)
 Kalam Marindi (1972)
 Anta Mana Manchike (1972)
 Andala Ramudu (1973) as Subba Rao's father-in-law
 Bhakta Tukaram (1973)
 Devudamma (1973) as Kotaiah
 Manchi Vallaki Manchivadu (1973)
 Tulabharam (1974) as Hari
 Muthyala Muggu (1975)
 Pichi Maraju (1976)
 Shri Rajeshwari Vilas Coffee Club (1976)
 Amara Deepam (1977) as  Manager
 Edureeta (1977)
 Manushulu Chesina Dongalu (1977)
 Devathalara Deevinchandi (1977)
 Lawyer Viswanath (1978)
 Seetamalakshmi (1978)
 Siri Siri Muvva (1978)
 Vayasu Pilichindi (1978)
 Thoorpu Velle Railu (1979)
 Saptapadhi (1980)
 Sirimalle Navvindi (1980)
 Subhodhayam (1980)
 Bhale Krishnudu (1980)
 Gopala Rao Gari Ammayi (1980)
 Sankarabharanam (1980)
 Amavasya Chandrudu (1981)
 Thyagayya (1981)
 Radha Kalyanam (1981)
 Madhura Swapnam (1982)
 Manchu Pallaki (1982) at Gita's father
 Kalavari Samsaram (1982)  as Subbaramaiah
 Subhalekha (1982)
 Sagara Sangamam (1983)
 Sitaara (1983)
 Nelavanka (1983)
 Rendu Jella Sita (1983)
 Janani Janmabhoomi (1984)
 Chattamtho Poratam (1985)
 Mogudu Pellalu (1985)
 Mantradandham (1985)
 Rendu Rella Aaru (1985)
 Jailu Pakshi (1986)
 Chantabbai (1986)
 Sirivennela (1986)
 Kaliyuga Pandavulu (1986)
 Kaliyuga Krishnudu (1986)
 Sankeerthana (1987)
 Sruthi Layalu (1987)
 Raaga Leela (1987)
 Janaki Ramudu (1988)
 Ramudu Bheemudu (1988) as Govindaiah
 Rowdy No.1 (1988) as Avadhani
 Swarna Kamalam (1988)
 Eeshwar (1989)
 Sutradhaarulu (1990)
 Karthavyam (1990) as Constable Ranganayakulu
 Shanti Kranti (1991)
 Naa Pellam Naa Ishtam (1991)
 Pelli Pustakam (1991)
 April 1st Vidudhala (1991)
 Dharma Kshetram (1992)
 Detective Narada (1992)
 Gharana Mogudu (1992) as  Bhawani's father
 Swathi Kiranam (1992)
 Joker (1993)
 Kunti Puthrudu (1993)
 Aa Okkati Adakku (1993) as Pellilla Peraiah
 Yamaleela (1994)
 Subha Sankalpam (1995)
 Linga Babu Love Story (1995)
 Vajram (1995)
 Swarabhishekam (2004)
 Vijay IPS (2006)

References

External links
 

Telugu male actors
1942 births
2005 deaths
Deaths from kidney failure
20th-century Indian male actors
Male actors in Telugu cinema
Indian male film actors
People from Krishna district
Male actors from Andhra Pradesh
21st-century Indian male actors